Henry Westerman Whillock (February 9, 1904 – August 9, 1992) was an American politician and television station general manager, who served on two occasions as mayor of Boise, Idaho, in the 1940s.

Whillock was the general manager of KBOI-Channel 2 in Boise, Idaho. 

Whillock was first elected mayor in 1941. An officer in the United States Navy, he resigned in May 1942 after being called to active duty during World War II. Whillock returned to Boise at war's end.

Whillock became mayor again in 1946. He was appointed to finish the term of Sam S. Griffin, who resigned.

References

Mayors of Boise - Past and Present
Idaho State Historical Society Reference Series, Corrected List of Mayors, 1867-1996

Mayors of Boise, Idaho
United States Navy personnel of World War II
1904 births
1992 deaths
20th-century American politicians
People from Humansville, Missouri
United States Navy officers